Christopher Gordon may refer to:

 Christopher Gordon (squash player) (born 1986), American squash player
 Christopher Gordon (composer), Australian composer
 Chris Gordon (ice hockey) (born 1970), American ice hockey goaltender
 Chris Gordon, vocalist and guitarist of Scottish rock band, Baby Chaos
 Chris Gordon, country music artist (born 1969)